Archibald Clark Kerr, 1st Baron Inverchapel,  (17 March 1882 – 5 July 1951), known as Sir Archibald Clark Kerr between 1935 and 1946, was a British diplomat. He served as Ambassador to the Soviet Union between 1942 and 1946 and to the United States between 1946 and 1948.

Background
An Australian-born Scot, Clark Kerr was born Archibald John Kerr Clark, the son of John Kerr Clark (1838–1910), originally from Lanarkshire, Scotland, and Kate Louisa (1846–1926), daughter of Sir John Struan Robertson, five times Premier of the Colony of New South Wales. His family emigrated to England in 1889. In 1911 he assumed the surname of Kerr in addition to that of Clark.
He attended Bath College from 1892 to 1900.

Diplomatic career
Clark Kerr entered the Foreign Service in 1906. Early on, he made the mistake of challenging the Foreign Office over its Egyptian policy. Consequently, he found himself posted to a series of capitals in Latin America. He was Envoy Extraordinary and Minister Plenipotentiary to various Central American republics between 1925 and 1928, to Chile between 1928 and 1930, to Sweden between 1931 and 1934 and to Iraq between 1935 and 1938.

He distinguished himself enough in these posts to secure a prestigious appointment as Ambassador to China between 1938 and 1942 during the Japanese occupation.

In the ensuing years, he developed a close relationship with the Nationalist Chinese leader Chiang Kai-Shek and spent most of his posting explaining why Britain could not offer him any substantive aid in his struggle against the Japanese invaders.

He argued for British aid to China based upon humanitarian concerns, the preservation of British economic influence and the principle of national self-determination. Despite the lack of aid from Britain, he impressed the Chinese with his interest in Confucian philosophy and with his determination. After the British consulate in Chungking was almost completely destroyed by Japanese bombing in 1940, other diplomatic missions evacuated, but he kept the Union Jack flying close to Chinese government buildings. He regularly swam in the Yangtze River and, after meeting the American writer Ernest Hemingway, dismissed him derisively: "Tough? Why, I'm tougher than he is!"

He was moved to Moscow in February 1942, where he forged a remarkable relationship with Stalin and facilitated a number of Anglo-Soviet diplomatic conferences. His work there and at the Big Three Conferences (such as Yalta and Potsdam) put him at the centre of international politics during the final pivotal years of the Second World War. Throughout his posting in Moscow, he unsuccessfully sought clearer direction from the Foreign Office in London. He often fell back upon a directive received from Churchill in February 1943: "You want a directive? All right. I don't mind kissing Stalin's bum, but I'm damned if I'll lick his arse!"

As the war neared its end, Kerr became increasingly concerned about Soviet plans for the postwar world. He did not think the Soviets to plan to begin spreading world revolution, but feared that they were preparing to exert their influence well beyond their prewar sphere of influence. He voiced deepseated concerns about Soviet expansionism for the first time in a lengthy memorandum on Soviet policy dated 31 August 1944. He then forecast three likely results of the war: the removal of any immediate threat to Soviet security, the consolidation of Stalin's dominant position and the Soviet use of communist parties in other countries to serve interests of "Russia as a state as distinct from Russia as a revolutionary notion". This closely resembled the conclusions that George F. Kennan included in a telegram to Washington a few months later.

After the war, he was appointed Ambassador to the United States, a post that he held until 1948. An acquaintance of Guy Burgess and Donald Duart Maclean's superior in Washington, he took their defection to the Soviet Union badly. The affair also cast a shadow over his career.

He was appointed a Knight Commander of the Order of St Michael and St George (KCMG) in the 1935 New Year Honours and a Knight Grand Cross in 1942 and was sworn of the Privy Council in 1944. In 1946 he was elevated to the peerage as Baron Inverchapel, of Loch Eck in the County of Argyll.

From November 1948 to January 1949 he was a member of the British delegation of the Committee for the Study of European Unity, convened by the Brussels Treaty Organisation to draw up the blueprint of the future Council of Europe.

Personal life
His personal life has been described as colourful. As a young diplomat, he lived in Washington with Major Archibald Butt (a military adviser to President Taft), and his partner, the artist Frank Millet. When he returned to the city 35 years later as British ambassador, he raised eyebrows "by going to stay in Eagle Grove, Iowa, with a strapping farm boy whom he had found waiting for a bus in Washington".

While stationed in Moscow, Kerr took a liking in Evgeni [later Eugene] Yost, a 24-year-old Volga German embassy butler who had gotten into legal trouble.  At Kerr's personal request, Stalin granted him permission to leave the Soviet Union to become Kerr's masseur and valet. Kerr jokingly referred to Yost as "a Russian slave given to me by Stalin". 

A close confidant of the Kaiser's sister in the years before the Great War, he was also a disappointed suitor of the Queen Mother before his marriage, divorce and remarriage to a Chilean woman 29 years his junior. Politically on the left, a noted wit and unconventional in manner, he was sometimes suspected of excessive understanding for the Soviet position. His biographer, Donald Gillies, considered the rumoured pro-Soviet sympathies to be highly unlikely.

He is best remembered in the public imagination for a much reproduced note he is said to have written in 1943 to Lord Pembroke while he was Ambassador to Moscow. A copy of the letter was published in The Spectator in 1978 with the comment that "an acquaintance has been delving among the Foreign Office records for the war years".

"My Dear Reggie,

In these dark days man tends to look for little shafts of light that spill from Heaven. My days are probably darker than yours, and I need, my God I do, all the light I can get. But I am a decent fellow, and I do not want to be mean and selfish about what little brightness is shed upon me from time to time. So I propose to share with you a tiny flash that has illuminated my sombre life and tell you that God has given me a new Turkish colleague whose card tells me that he is called Mustapha Kunt.

We all feel like that, Reggie, now and then, especially when Spring is upon us, but few of us would care to put it on our cards. It takes a Turk to do that.

Sir Archibald Clerk Kerr, 
H.M. Ambassador"

In 1929, he married a woman belonging to the Chilean aristocracy, Doña María Teresa Díaz y Salas, of Santiago, Chile, the daughter of Don Javier Díaz y Lira and Doña Ventura Salas y Edwards. He died in July 1951, aged 69. The barony died with him, as he had no children.

References

Donald Gillies, Radical diplomat: the life of Archibald Clark Kerr, Lord Inverchapel, 1882–1951; I.B.Tauris publishers, London and New York, 1999. 
Erik Goldstein, 'Kerr, Archibald John Kerr Clark, Baron Inverchapel (1882–1951)', Oxford Dictionary of National Biography, Oxford University Press, 2004,

External links

 Clark Kerr's letter to Lord Pembroke
 Photograph of Clark Kerr at the National Portrait Gallery.

1882 births
1951 deaths
Diplomatic peers
Ambassadors of the United Kingdom to China
Ambassadors of the United Kingdom to the Soviet Union
Ambassadors of the United Kingdom to the United States
Knights Grand Cross of the Order of St Michael and St George
Members of the Privy Council of the United Kingdom
Ambassadors of the United Kingdom to Sweden
Ambassadors of the United Kingdom to Iraq
Ambassadors of the United Kingdom to Chile
Australian peers
Australian recipients of British honours
Australian Knights Grand Cross of the Order of St Michael and St George
Australian emigrants to England
Barons created by George VI